Orthomecyna exigua is a moth of the family Crambidae. It is endemic to the Hawaiian islands of Molokai, Maui, Lanai and Hawaii.

Subspecies
Orthomecyna exigua exigua (Molokai, Maui, Lanai, Hawaii)
Orthomecyna exigua cupreipennis Butler, 1883 (Lanai)

External links

Crambinae
Endemic moths of Hawaii